A jubilee is a particular anniversary of an event, usually denoting the 25th (silver), 40th (ruby), 50th (golden), 60th (diamond), or 70th (platinum), anniversary.

Jubilee may also refer to:

Events

Anniversaries and celebrations
Jubilee (biblical) (Hebrew yovel יובל), end of seven cycles of shmita (Sabbatical years) in the Mosaic Law
Jubilee of the Reunification of Jerusalem, an Israeli celebration in 2017 
Jubilee in the Catholic Church, occurring every 25 years, in celebration of the mercy of God
 Great Jubilee, the Catholic jubilee that occurred in the year 2000
List of jubilees of British monarchs

Other events
Jubilee riots, in Toronto, Canada in 1875
Mobile Bay jubilee, a regularly occurring natural underwater phenomenon
Operation Jubilee, the Dieppe Raid by the Allied Forces on Dieppe in WW-2 (1942)

Arts and entertainment

Film, television and radio
Jubilee (1978 film), a cult film directed by Derek Jarman
Jubilee, a 2000 comedy film directed by Michael Hurst
Jubilee (radio program), an Armed Forces Radio Service program 1942–1953
Jubilee Bunt-a-thon, a 2012 animated short film
Jubilee1, a former Scottish local radio station

Literature
Book of Jubilees, an ancient Jewish religious text
Jubilee (collection), a collection of short stories by Jack Dann
Jubilee (comics), a Marvel Comics character
Jubilee (novel), by Margaret Walker

Music
Jubilee (opera), a 1976 opera by Ulysses Kay
Jubilee Records, an American independent record label
Jubilee quartet, a style of 20th-Century African-American religious vocal group

Musical groups
Fisk Jubilee Singers, African-American a cappella ensemble of students at Fisk University
Jubilee (band), American rock band
The Jubilees, English rock band

Albums
Jubilee (Japanese Breakfast album), 2021
Jubilee (Maverick City Music album), 2021
Jubilee (The Deep Dark Woods album), 2013
Jubilee (Grant Lee Buffalo album) or the title song, 1998
Jubilee (Sex Pistols album), 2002
Jubilee (Ten Shekel Shirt album) or the title song, 2008
Jubilee (Versailles album), 2010
Jubilee,  by Glenn Yarbrough, 1970
Jubilee: Live at Wolf Trap, a 1996 live video album by Mary Chapin Carpenter

EPs
 Jubilee (EP), 2021 EP by Maverick City Music

Songs
"Jubilee" (Maverick City Music song), by Maverick City Music from Jubilee, 2021
"Jubilee", by 10,000 Maniacs from Blind Man's Zoo, 1989
"Jubilee", by Alison Krauss, 2004
"Jubilee", by Blur from Parklife, 1994
"Jubilee", by Mary Chapin Carpenter from Stones in the Road, 1992
"Jubilee", by Patti Smith from Trampin', 2004
"Jubilee", by Spyro Gyra from Morning Dance, 1979
"Jubilee", written by Willard Robison
"Jubilee Song", a song written by Fr. Carlo Magno Marcelo in 1996 for the Great Jubilee of 2000
"Junk" (song), working title "Jubilee", by Paul McCartney, 1968

Theatre
Jubilee (audio drama), based on the British television series Doctor Who
Jubilee (musical), a 1935 stage musical by Cole Porter and Moss Hart
Jubilee, a 2001 play by Peter Barnes
Jubilee!, a long-running Las Vegas burlesque show that opened in 1981 
The Jubilee, a 1769 play by David Garrick

Other uses in arts and entertainment
Jubilee (solitaire), two solitaire card games

People
James Fisk (financier) (1835–1872), American stockbroker and corporate executive known as "Jubilee Jim"
Jubilee (DJ), American electronic musician
Jubilee Dunbar (born 1949), American gridiron football player
Jubilee Jenna Mandl, Austrian figure skater

Places
Jubilee Auditorium (disambiguation), either of two facilities in Alberta, Canada
Jubilee Cave, the longest show cave at Jenolan Caves in the Blue Mountains, New South Wales, Australia
Jubilee Lake, in Oregon, United States
Jubilee Oil Field, in the South Atlantic Ocean
Jubilee Peak, in the South Shetland Islands near the Antarctic Peninsula
Jubilee Pool, in Penzance, Cornwall, England
Jubilee Recreation Centre, in Fort Saskatchewan, Alberta, Canada
Jubilee River, in southern England
Jubilee Rock, in Blisland, Cornwall, England
Jubilee Walkway, in London, England

Transportation
MS Jubilee, a former cruise ship also known as Pacific Sun and Henna
Jubilee, collective name of the Boeing 777 fleet owned by Singapore Airlines
Jubilee Class (disambiguation), locomotives and ocean liners
Jubilee Exhibition Railway, formerly in Adelaide, South Australia

Stations and lines
Health Sciences/Jubilee station, in Edmonton, Alberta, Canada
Jubilee Bus Station, Secunderabad, India
Jubilee line, the newest line on the London Underground network
 Jubilee Line Extension
SAIT/AUArts/Jubilee station, in Calgary, Alberta, Canada

Organizations
Jubilee 2000, a former international organization dedicated to debt cancellation and poverty reduction
Jubilee Alliance, a former political alliance in Kenya
Jubilee Debt Coalition, successor to the Jubilee 2000 coalition
Jubilee Party, a Kenyan political party established in 2016

Other uses
Debt jubilee, a clearance of debt from public records across a wide sector or a nation
Jubilee Clip, a genericised brand name for a worm-drive hose clamp
Jubilee FC, a football (soccer) team in Liberia
Jubilee High School, in Addlestone, Surrey, England
Jubilee School, in Amman, Jordan

See also

"Jewbilee", an episode of the TV series South Park